Emmanuel Justine Rabby Banda (born 29 September 1997) is a Zambian footballer who plays for Supersport HNL club Rijeka as a centre midfielder.

Club career
Emmanuel Banda started his career with Nchanga Rangers FC.

In July 2016, Banda moved to Portuguese club S.C. Esmoriz. 

In July 2017, Banda moved to Belgian First Division A club K.V. Oostende on a three-year contract. He made his league debut on 30 July 2017 in a 1-0 home loss to Royal Excel Mouscron. He replaced Michiel Jonckheere in the 75th minute. He scored his first goal in the Belgian top flight on 22 December 2017 in a 3-1 away victory over Waasland-Beveren. His goal, assisted by Knowledge Musona, came in the 52nd minute and gave his side a 2-1 lead. He joined Béziers on loan in January 2019.
In February 2020, Emmanuel Banda signed a three-year contract with the reigning Swedish champions Djurgårdens IF.

References

External links
 
 

1997 births
Living people
Zambian footballers
Zambia international footballers
Zambia youth international footballers
Zambian expatriate footballers
K.V. Oostende players
AS Béziers (2007) players
Belgian Pro League players
Ligue 2 players
Nchanga Rangers F.C. players
Allsvenskan players
Djurgårdens IF Fotboll players
HNK Rijeka players
Expatriate footballers in Belgium
Expatriate footballers in France
Expatriate footballers in Portugal
Expatriate footballers in Sweden
Expatriate footballers in Croatia
Association football midfielders
People from Chililabombwe District
2019 Africa U-23 Cup of Nations players
Zambia under-20 international footballers